Anne Rikala (born February 20, 1977 in Kangasala) is a Finnish sprint canoer who has competed since 2005. She won four medals at the ICF Canoe Sprint World Championships with two silvers (K-1 200 m and K-1 500 m: both 2007) and two bronzes (K-1 5000 m: 2010, K-2 200 m: 2006).

Rikala also competed at the 2008 Summer Olympics in Beijing, finishing seventh in the K-2 500 m event while being eliminated in the semifinals of the K-1 500 m event.  At the 2012 Summer Olympics, she competed in the K-1 500 m again, finishing in eighth.

References

Sports-reference.com profile

1977 births
Living people
People from Kangasala
Canoeists at the 2008 Summer Olympics
Canoeists at the 2012 Summer Olympics
Finnish female canoeists
Olympic canoeists of Finland
ICF Canoe Sprint World Championships medalists in kayak
Sportspeople from Pirkanmaa